George Pierce may refer to:

 George Pierce (backstage doorman), American backstage doorman
 George Pierce (baseball) (1888–1935), American baseball player
 George Edmond Pierce (1794–1871), American minister and president of Western Reserve University
 George Foster Pierce (1811–1884), American Methodist bishop and college president
 George H. Pierce (1872–1967), New York politician
 George T. Pierce (c. 1823–1874), New York politician
 G. W. Pierce (George Washington Pierce, 1872–1956), American physicist
 USS George F. Pierce (ID-648)

See also
 George Peirce (disambiguation)
 George Pearce (disambiguation)
 George Pearse (disambiguation)